Gennaro Sheffield D'Acampo (born Gennaro D'Acampo; 17 July 1976) is an Italian celebrity chef and media personality based in the United Kingdom, best known for his food-focused television shows and cookbooks.

D'Acampo rose to fame as a regular chef on the ITV show This Morning. He has since presented cookery programmes including Let's Do Lunch, There's No Taste Like Home, and Gino's Italian Escape. In June 2020, it was announced that D'Acampo would be the presenter of the new revival series of Family Fortunes on ITV 18 years after the last series.

Career
In 1995, aged 19, D'Acampo moved to London to work in The Orchard Restaurant, Hampstead, London and the Cambio Restaurant in Guildford, Surrey.

D'Acampo co-owns Bontà Italia Ltd, a supplier of Italian ingredients, and has a career in the development of ready meals, beginning with the Tesco Finest range. This experience led to his first engagement as a guest on Great Food Live on UKTV Food and the start of his television career.

In 2009, D'Acampo was crowned King of the Jungle in the ninth series of I'm a Celebrity... Get Me Out of Here!. After the show, D'Acampo and fellow contestant Stuart Manning were charged by the Australian police with animal cruelty for killing and cooking a rat on the show. However, the charges were later dropped after ITV accepted responsibility for the incident.

D'Acampo has regularly appeared on the ITV series This Morning. He launched his first iPhone app "Gino D'Acampo – Eating Italian" in 2010.

From 2011 until 2014, D'Acampo and Melanie Sykes presented the daytime cookery programme Let's Do Lunch With Gino and Mel. The show aired for four series and three Christmas series from 2012 to 2014. D'Acampo hosts a Sunday afternoon cookery and discussion show on LBC 97.3. In 2011, D'Acampo presented the daytime cookery series There's No Taste Like Home for thirty episodes.

In 2013, D'Acampo launched a chain of restaurants with his name followed by My Pasta Bar or My Restaurant,. His first Pasta Bar opened on Fleet Street in July 2013. There are also restaurants in Leadenhall Market, Bishopsgate, Euston railway station, The Manchester Corn Exchange, Harrogate, Camden Town (Gino D'Acampo My Restaurant)

Since 2013, D'Acampo has presented seven series of Gino's Italian Escape on ITV. A cookery book is released to accompany each series.

In autumn 2014, D'Acampo filled in as a team captain for Holly Willoughby on the ITV2 panel show Celebrity Juice, while she went on maternity leave. D'Acampo also appeared in the following series in Spring 2015, this time as a regular panellist. D'Acampo returned to Celebrity Juice in September 2015 where he replaced Fearne Cotton as team captain whilst she was on maternity leave.

In 2015 and 2017, D'Acampo toured the UK with a live stage show called Gino's Italian Escape to accompany his television series. He visited cities including Bath, Newcastle and Margate.
In May 2018, it was confirmed that Channel 5 had picked up Win Your Wish List for its Saturday night schedule, with D'Acampo as host. The show is now called Gino's Win Your Wish List. The revival is produced by Stellify Media.

In December 2018, D'Acampo was woken up by Michael McIntyre for the Midnight Gameshow in the fourth series of Michael McIntyre's Big Show.

Books

Fantastico! (2007)
Buonissimo! (2008)
The Italian Diet (2010)
Gino's Pasta (2011)
Italian Home Baking (2011)
Gino's Italian Escape (2013)
Gino's Italian Escape: A Taste of the Sun (2014)
Gino's Veg Italia! 100 Quick and Easy Vegetarian Recipes (2015)
Gino's Italian Escape: Islands in the Sun (2015)
Gino's Hidden Italy (2016)
Gino's Healthy Italian for Less (2017)
Gino's Italian Coastal Escape (2017)
Gino's Italian Adriatic Escape (2018)
Gino's Italian Express (2019)
Gino's Italian Family Adventure (28 October 2021)

Personal life
D'Acampo lives with his wife Jessica Stellina Morrison, whom he married in 2002. He has three children.

In 1998, D'Acampo was convicted of burgling singer Paul Young's London home, and served two years in prison. D'Acampo has apologised to Young, who accepted and suggested that D'Acampo could invite him to dinner in his restaurant.

D'Acampo is a fan of the rugby union team Leicester Tigers.

Filmography

Television

Film

References

External links

Gino D'Acampo at the British Film Institute

1976 births
Living people
Italian cookbook writers
Italian businesspeople
Italian chefs
People of Campanian descent
Italian emigrants to the United Kingdom
I'm a Celebrity...Get Me Out of Here! (British TV series) winners
People from Torre del Greco
People from Elstree